Visit Philadelphia, formally known as the Greater Philadelphia Tourism Marketing Corporation (GPTMC), is a private, non-profit organization that promotes leisure travel to the five-county Philadelphia metropolitan area (Bucks, Chester, Delaware, Montgomery, and Philadelphia counties). It was founded in 1996 by the City of Philadelphia, the Commonwealth of Pennsylvania and The Pew Charitable Trusts. In 1998, House Bill 2858, Act 174 designated VISIT PHILADELPHIA, then GPTMC, to serve as the official Regional Attractions Marketing Agency.

Corporate Information 

As the region's official tourism marketing agency, Visit Philadelphia works to build the Greater Philadelphia area's image, drive visitation and boost the economy. The organization utilizes robust campaigns, media relations, advertising, websites and social media to market the area and promote tourism. Its goal is to show potential tourists that Philadelphia is a destination to visit.

History

Founding 
Philadelphia Mayor Edward G. Rendell created the GPTMC in 1996 to attract tourists; the corporation operated separately from the Philadelphia Convention and Visitors Bureau. According to the Encyclopedia of Greater Philadelphia, the newly created agency "took a regional approach to 'Philadelphia and Its Countryside' and formed partnerships with similar organizations in the region: the Valley Forge Convention and Visitors Board, Visit Bucks County, and the Brandywine Conference and Visitors Bureau, among others."

Name change 
Prior to 2013, Visit Philadelphia was named The Greater Philadelphia Tourism and Marketing Corporation (GPTMC). In 2010, GPTMC launched a new web platform, VisitPhilly.com, and began plans for an official name change. However, it wasn’t until three years later, in 2013, when the change became official. Visit Philadelphia’s website was the most-visited destination website of the 10 largest cities in the U.S. that year.

Several factors were instrumental in facilitating the name change, perhaps most prominently being an effort to utilize a more self-explanatory moniker. A drive toward greater technological optimization also played a part in orchestrating the change. An internal study found that the word “Philadelphia” was searched much more frequently than any other word when internet users inquired about the city. The name change made it much easier for interested travelers to find the organization.

Notable initiatives and programs 
Since its first national ad campaign in 1997, Visit Philly has launched a variety of campaigns and initiatives considered especially innovative for a destination marketing organization. All of these campaigns were implemented with the goal of communicating Philadelphia’s personal essence, voice and image.

Philly, the City that Loves You Back 
Its first national ad campaign took place in 1997. This campaign introduced the slogan "The City that Loves you Back" as both "a reply and a challenge to the 'I Love New York' slogan" and a way to counter the "antisocial reputation" that Philadelphia had developed. Though this was not the first campaign, it marked a change from earlier campaigns that mostly focused on the city’s historical artifacts in Center City, such as Independence Hall and the Liberty Bell. The firm Longwoods International estimated that the “Place That Loves You Back” campaign was responsible for attracting more than 1 million new visitors on overnight and day trips to the region.

In 2009, Visit Philadelphia began a new campaign with the "With Love, Philadelphia XOXO" tagline.

Get Your History Straight and Your Nightlife Gay 
In 2003, the slogan “Get your history straight and your nightlife gay” was created in order to attract more LGBT tourism. The first ads were vintage-inspired flyers with Benjamin Franklin and Betsy Ross, though later ads included the landmark 2004 TV spot “Pen Pals”.

Prior to the campaign, Philadelphia was not on the list of top 20 LGBT destinations. In response, the city became the first destination to run a gay TV commercial, and by 2010, moved up to tie for 9th position of places visited by gay and lesbian travelers, according to Community Marketing, an LGBT market research firm.

Reactions to the campaign were initially mixed, with 300 people responding to the TV ad, two-thirds of which were disapproving. In 2005, State Rep. Daryl D. Metcalfe (R., Butler) sent letters to fellow House members complaining that tax dollars were being used to "promote immoral behaviors." However, this did not catch on with other legislative members. The campaign was honored by the U.S. Travel Association, the Association of National Advertisers, Hospitality Sales and Marketing Association International, the Public Relations Society of America, and PRWeek for its creativity and performance in the marketplace.

Philly’s More Fun When You Sleep Over 
The attacks on September 11, 2001 had a significantly negative impact on overnight stays in cities across the United States. As a way to combat this resistance to travel and curb losses to its $1 billion hospitality industry, Visit Philadelphia (then GPTMC) launched a consumer campaign and hotel package.

“Philly’s More Fun When You Sleep Over,” the resulting campaign, kept things light and depicted tourists dancing around in their pajamas checking out classic spots such as the Museum of Art and Independence Mall. The overnight hotel package focused on potential visitors living within easy driving distance, specifically those along the East Coast in cities such as Baltimore, Harrisburg, and the surrounding Philadelphia counties.

The campaign led to the sale of 36,000 hotel room nights at 44 different hotels between November and March 2002. Research conducted by Smith Travel Research showed that Philadelphia lost less annual revenue from overnight hotel stays than any major Northeast city post September 11. In fact, Philadelphia’s overnight visitation grew 15% from 2000 to 2002. The research also showed a significant improvement in Greater Philadelphia’s image from 1997 to 2002.

With Love, Philadelphia XOXO 
In 2009, Visit Philadelphia began a new campaign coining the tagline "With Love, Philadelphia XOXO. The visual component of the advertising campaign was presented in the form of a mashup of notes from the city itself to potential visitors.

While the campaign rolled out a variety of new efforts for the destination marketing organization, the centerpiece of the campaign was the organization's new website -- visitphilly.com. Prior to the shift, the organization’s website was named “gophila.com.” The campaign also marked a greater push into the social media realm for the organization, including an increased presence on Facebook and Twitter.

Launched in response to the ongoing recession, the “With Love, Philadelphia XOXO” campaign helped recapture a segment of the population that was quickly dwindling, tourists. As many destination marketing organizations struggled to find ways to stimulate demand in the travel industry, Visit Philadelphia re-engaged consumers using this campaign’s strategy, which paired “love letters” from the city with good deals aimed at tourists. Ultimately, the campaign generated over 3.7 million incremental trips in 2010 alone and over $432 million in additional direct spending into the local economy.

The campaign achieved national recognition for its creativity and success. In 2011, the U.S. Travel Association awarded its coveted Destiny Awards honor for best full marketing campaign to the “With Love, Philadelphia XOXO'' campaign. The campaign was also included in Frommer’s round up of their 15 favorite tourism slogans in February 2012.

Philly 360 
While the destination marketing organization had dabbled in social media campaigns before, Philly 360 was Visit Philadelphia’s first major non-traditional, social media-focused campaign. The goal of the campaign was to promote Philadelphia with a younger African-American perspective. By concentrating on music, nightlife, fashion, the arts, and other similar topics, the Philly 360 campaign hoped to widen its reach to a younger demographic.

Though Visit Philadelphia had been seeking to attract  African Americans through its marketing campaigns since the 90s, Philly 360 marked the first time that the organization specifically marketed to  the emerging group of urban African American travelers under 40. The campaign, launched in 2009, spoke to an urban Millennial audience looking to explore the country’s metropolitan hubs and driven by a need for diverse creative influence.

Visit Philadelphia rolled out Philly 360 in the hopes that it would achieve the same level of success with the African American community as its “Philadelphia - Get Your History Straight and Your Nightlife Gay” campaign received from the LGBTQ+ community in 2003. The campaign helped to extend the Visit Philadelphia brand, while also rallying the African-American creative community through partnerships with artists such as DJ Jazzy Jeff and The Roots.

Filadelfia - You Gotta Feel it 
“Filadelfia — You Gotta Feel It” was a marketing campaign to attract Latinx visitors over the summer of 2019. The campaign used Spanglish messaging, such as “Pero there’s so much more,” in ads showcasing Philadelphia’s tourist attractions and local restaurants. The campaign was launched with ads on major TV networks like Telemundo and social media posts by Latinx influencers like Sebastián Gómez and Esperanza Hernández of @twotrends.

The campaign was developed with the help of the Latino Advisory Marketing Committee, and also included a five-part video series featuring Latinx influencers visiting classic Philadelphia spots. In addition to TV ads, Visit Philadelphia also placed ads in public transportation stops, metro stations and highways to encourage travelers to visit the 38th Annual Hispanic Fiesta, the Latin Alternative Music Conference, or Salsa at Spruce. To attract regional visitors looking for an overnight stay, ads were placed in both New York and D.C. public transit stations, including a takeover of New York’s Penn Station.

“Filadelfia — You Gotta Feel It”, along with “Philadelphia Pioneers on the Road to Stonewall,” won Visit Philadelphia the Outstanding Association Award at The Philadelphia Inquirer’s 2019 Diversity & Inclusion Awards Gala. The campaign also received the Corporate Initiative of the Year award from the Greater Philadelphia Hispanic Chamber of Commerce for showcasing the diversity within the Hispanic community and featuring Hispanic entrepreneurship.

Philadelphia Pioneers on the Road to Stonewall 
To commemorate the 50th anniversary of the Stonewall riots, Visit Philadelphia created the “Philadelphia Pioneers On the Road to Stonewall'' float for the Philadelphia LGBTQ+ Pride Parade and World Pride 2019 in New York. The Road to Stonewall campaign and float were funded in partnership with the Commonwealth of Pennsylvania and dmhFund.  Apart from New York City itself, Visit Philadelphia’s LGBTQ+ advertising presence at World Pride 2019 was the largest of any city in the country. The organization participated in its ninth Station Domination at Penn Station, which included a full-motion video projection featuring LGBTQ+ and Stonewall graphics, two women of color in front of Independence Hall, two men holding hands at the Liberty Bell, and a drag performer.

The float itself, designed by artist Todd Marocci, was 34-feet in length. In the front, it featured a gold 7-foot-tall replica of the Liberty Bell and at its back stood a 3D-printed reproduction of the Stonewall Inn. In between the two, a platform connected either end with five chairs in the middle marking each decade that had passed since the riots. Though the Stonewall riots of 1969 are widely considered the most significant moment in the struggle for LGBTQ+ rights, Philadelphia’s Annual Reminders played a significant part in the fight for rights as well. The Annual Reminders, organized by a local gay rights group in 1965, featured yearly pickets outside of the Liberty Bell, which were the first of their kind in the U.S. After the Stonewall riots, protesters moved to the site of the Inn for future demonstrations and the fight continued on.

The float, on show at both the Philadelphia LGBTQ+ Pride Parade and World Pride 2019, pays tribute to both historic movements. The campaign won Visit Philly the Outstanding Association Award at The Philadelphia Inquirer’s 2019 Diversity & Inclusion Awards Gala, alongside PHL Diversity and Prospanica Philadelphia, and received a 2019 HSMAI Gold Adrian Award.

City of Sisterly Love 
In 2020, Philadelphia’s nickname was temporarily changed from “The City of Brotherly Love” to “The City of Sisterly Love” to honor the 100th anniversary of the 19th Amendment. The resolution to change the nickname was introduced by Councilwoman Katherine Gilmore Richardson and co-sponsored by all seven women on the council.  The resolution was intended to celebrate the achievements of the women's suffrage movement, while acknowledging that women of color were not fully enfranchised until The Voting Rights Act of 1965.

The nickname change was a joint effort between City Council and Visit Philadelphia as part of its year long initiative to celebrate sisterhood. To advertise the nickname change, Visit Philly put up a billboard in New York’s Times Square welcoming people to the City of Sisterly Love.

Community Relations

Awards

Controversies and disputes

Embezzlement scandal 
Joyce Levitt, who worked for Visit Philadelphia from 2003 to 2012 and served as CFO for seven years, embezzled $210,000 from the organization between September 2005 and the discovery of the fraud in 2012. Visit Philadelphia did not report the misconduct to authorities, instead allowing Levitt to quietly resign and pay full restitution. In 2014, following media reports, the Philadelphia District Attorney conducted a grand jury investigation leading to the prosecution of Levitt. In May 2016, in a plea agreement with prosecutors, Levitt pleaded guilty to theft, receiving stolen property, and fraud, and was sentenced to three years' probation and community service; she also forfeited her accounting license.

Consolidation attempt 
In 2014, the Philadelphia City Controller's office issued a report urging the consolidation of Visit Philadelphia and the Philadelphia Convention and Visitors Bureau. The report found that the agencies had occasionally clashed, had competing slogans, and did not adequately coordinate efforts, and concluded that merging the two agencies could save $1 million in administrative costs annually. The report found that from 1993 to 2013, "the annual number of overnight leisure travelers to Philadelphia increased by 84 percent" and Visit Philadelphia was credited for about two-thirds of that increase. The report contrasted this to business travel (the responsibility of PHLCVB), which was "essentially flat since 1997." The report, found, however, that PHLCVB had a better return on investment ("$74 for each tax dollar spent as opposed to $69 per tax dollar spent by Visit Philadelphia") because business travelers tend to spend more than tourists.

References

External links

Government of Philadelphia
Tourism agencies
Tourism in Pennsylvania
Organizations established in 1996